The term Watson-class lifeboat refers to several wooden lifeboat classes operated by the Royal National Lifeboat Institution (RNLI) around the coasts of the United Kingdom and Ireland between 1888 and 1991. The boats had hulls that conformed to the basic design laid down by RNLI naval architect George Lennox Watson.

History
During the late Victorian period, the vast majority of lifeboats in service with the RNLI were of the self-righting type. The disadvantage of the self-righters was their lack of stability and to meet the requirements of stations which preferred the stability of a non self-righting type G.L. Watson conceived the hull type that bore his name. Over the next 27 years, 42 Watson-class pulling and sailing types were built at a variety of lengths, the commonest being the 38-footer.

In 1904 the RNLI began experimenting with motor lifeboats when a 38 ft Self-righter was converted. In 1906 three other lifeboats were converted to motor but none of these was a Watson. However, when in 1908 the first new build motor lifeboats were constructed, two of them were Watson types. Over the next 55 years, 171 boats of the various Watson-classes were built. There was, of course, no connection between a 1908 40 ft Watson and a 1963 47 ft Watson other than a similarity in basic hull form.

There were 11 lengths of boat in 8 separate classes:

Fleet

38-43ft Watson-class
The first Watson motor lifeboats were based on the most common pulling and sailing hulls, the 38 ft, 40 ft and 43 ft types. Apart from the addition of an engine and propeller, there was little to distinguish them from their sail and oar powered predecessors. The engines in the early motor types were regarded almost as an auxiliary and the boats, which had an open deck with end boxes, retained sails and oars. Engines from Tylor, Blake and Wolseley were used, although the Tylor was the most satisfactory and the two Blake engined boats were re-engined with Tylors in 1914. Power output of the Tylors was 40 bhp which gave a speed of around seven knots.

45ft Watson-class

The first standard class of Watson motor, began with the conversion of a pulling and sailing boat in 1912. Production began in 1919 and 22 boats were built between then and 1925.

45ft 6in Watson-class

The 45 ft 6in Watson marked the transition from single engine to twin engine layout. The first two boats were single engined, but the rest were twins. Produced between 1926 and 1935, 23 were built.

40ft 6in Watson-class
This small series of single engine boats built in 1929-30 was the precursor of the twin engine  type of 1933, which had a hull of the same  beam but  longer. The boats resembled scaled down versions of the contemporary  type, with a small shelter ahead of the aft cockpit with the exhaust funnel in front of it. All were built by J. Samuel White at Cowes and were powered by a 50 bhp Weyburn CE4 4-cylinder petrol engine driving a single screw. They served until the mid 1950s when they were replaced at their respective stations by new  class boats.

41ft Watson-class

The first twin engined medium-sized Watson class intended for stations unable to accommodate the larger types. Thirteen were built, nine between 1933 and 1939 and a further four between 1948 and 1952.

46ft Watson-class

The next development of the large Watson saw the introduction of diesel engines. Four of the first five were petrol engined, the fourth was the first new build diesel engined lifeboat for the RNLI and the remainder followed suit. Twenty eight boats were built, not including two destroyed whilst under construction in an air raid on Groves & Guttridge's yard at Cowes. Production ran from 1936 to 1946.

46ft 9in Watson-class

The first post-war Watson type, the first five resembled the  type, but from 1948 a major redesign resulted in a new superstructure with midships steering and a large cabin aft. Twenty eight were built between 1947 and 1956.

42ft Watson-class

Like the  intended for stations unable to accommodate larger types but needing something bigger than a carriage launched type, the  Watson introduced the use of commercial diesel engines rather than the RNLI's own designs. Ten were built between 1954 and 1962

47ft Watson-class

The final incarnation of the Watson inspired hull, the  Watson was the last non self-righting class built for the RNLI other than the   cruising boats. They were the first type to have an enclosed wheelhouse (other than the unique "fast" lifeboat of 1929). The first was built in 1955, but full production began in 1957 and continued to 1963 with eighteen built.

References